Mary Ellen Mark (March 20, 1940 – May 25, 2015) was an American photographer known for her photojournalism, documentary photography, portraiture, and advertising photography. She photographed people who were "away from mainstream society and toward its more interesting, often troubled fringes".

Mark had 18 collections of her work published, most notably Streetwise and Ward 81. Her work was exhibited at galleries and museums worldwide and widely published in Life, Rolling Stone, The New Yorker, New York Times, and Vanity Fair. She was a member of Magnum Photos between 1977 and 1981. She received numerous accolades, including three Robert F. Kennedy Journalism Awards, three fellowships from the National Endowment for the Arts, the 2014 Lifetime Achievement in Photography Award from the George Eastman House and the Outstanding Contribution Photography Award from the World Photography Organisation.

Life and work
Mark was born and raised in Elkins Park, Pennsylvania. and began photographing with a Box Brownie camera at age nine. She attended Cheltenham High School, where she was head cheerleader and exhibited a knack for painting and drawing. She received a Bachelor of Fine Arts in painting and art history from the University of Pennsylvania in 1962. After graduating, she worked briefly in the Philadelphia city planning department, then returned for a master's degree in photojournalism at the Annenberg School for Communication at the University of Pennsylvania, which she received in 1964. The following year, Mark received a Fulbright Scholarship to photograph in Turkey for a year, from which she produced her first book, Passport (1974). While there, she traveled to photograph England, Germany, Greece, Italy, and Spain.

In 1966 or 1967, she moved to New York City, where over the next several years she photographed demonstrations in opposition to the Vietnam War, the women's liberation movement, transvestite culture, and Times Square, developing a sensibility, according to one writer, "away from mainstream society and toward its more interesting, often troubled fringes". Her photography addressed social issues such as homelessness, loneliness, drug addiction, and prostitution. Children are a reoccurring subject throughout much of Mark's work. She described her approach to her subjects: "I’ve always felt that children and teenagers are not "children," they’re small people. I look at them as little people and I either like them or I don’t like them. I also have an obsession with mental illness. And strange people who are outside the borders of society." Mark also said "I’d rather pull up things from another culture that are universal, that we can all relate to...There are prostitutes all over the world. I try to show their way of life." and that "I feel an affinity for people who haven't had the best breaks in society. What I want to do more than anything is acknowledge their existence". Mark was well known for establishing strong relationships with her subjects. For Ward 81 (1979), she lived for six weeks with the patients in the women’s security ward of Oregon State Hospital, and for Falkland Road (1981), she spent three months befriending the prostitutes who worked on a single long street in Bombay. Her project "Streets of the Lost" with writer Cheryl McCall, for Life, produced her book Streetwise (1988) and was developed into the documentary film Streetwise, directed by her husband Martin Bell and with a soundtrack by Tom Waits.

Mark was also a unit photographer on movie sets, shooting production stills of more than 100 movies, including Arthur Penn's Alice's Restaurant (1969), Mike Nichols' Catch-22 (1970) and Carnal Knowledge (1971), Francis Ford Coppola's Apocalypse Now (1979), and Baz Luhrmann's Australia (2008). For Look magazine, she photographed Federico Fellini shooting Satyricon (1969).

Mark worked with film, using a wide range of cameras in various formats, from 35 mm, 120/220, 4×5-inch view camera, and a 20×24 Polaroid Land Camera, primarily in black and white using Kodak Tri-X film.

She published 18 books of photographs and contributed to publications that include Life, Rolling Stone, The New Yorker, New York Times, and Vanity Fair;. Mark was transparent with the subjects of her photography about her intent to use what she saw in the world for her art, about which she has said "I just think it's important to be direct and honest with people about why you're photographing them and what you're doing. After all, you are taking some of their soul."

Mark joined Magnum Photos in 1977 and left in 1981, joining Archive Pictures and then in 1988 opened her own agency. She served as a guest juror for photography call for entries at The Center for Fine Art Photography and taught workshops at the International Center of Photography in New York, in Mexico and at the Center for Photography at Woodstock.

She was the cowriter, associate producer and still photographer for the feature film American Heart (1992), starring Jeff Bridges and Edward Furlong, and directed by Martin Bell. It depicts a gruff ex-convict who struggles to get his life back on track.

Mark died on May 25, 2015 in Manhattan, aged 75, of myelodysplastic syndrome, a blood illness caused by bone marrow failure.

Publications
 Passport. New York: Lustrum Press, 1974. .
 Photojournalism: Mary Ellen Mark and Annie Leibovitz: The Woman's Perspective. Petersons, 1974. .
 Ward 81. New York: Simon & Schuster, 1979. . Main text by Karen Folger Jacobs, introduction by Miloš Forman.
 2nd ed. Bologna: Damiani, 2008. .
 Falkland Road: Prostitutes of Bombay: Photographs and Text. New York: Knopf, 1981. .
 Photographs of Mother Teresa's Mission of Charity in Calcutta. Carmel, CA: Friends of Photography, 1985. . Introduction by David Featherston.
 Streetwise. Philadelphia: University of Pennsylvania, 1988. . Text and photographs edited by Nancy Baker, introduction by John Irving.
 Second printing. New York: Aperture, 1992. .
 The Photo Essay. Photographers at Work series. Washington, DC: Smithsonian Institution Press, 1990. .
 Mary Ellen Mark: 25 Years. New York: Bulfinch, 1991. . Text by Marianne Fulton. Accompanied an exhibition at George Eastman House.
 Indian Circus. San Francisco: Chronicle Books, 1993, and Japan: Takarajimasha, 1993. . Foreword by John Irving.
 Portraits. Milan: Federico Motta, 1995. . Italian-language version.
 Washington: Smithsonian Institution, 1997. . Foreword by Mary Panzer.
 A Cry for Help: Stories of Homelessness and Hope. New York: Simon & Schuster, 1996. . Introduction by Andrew Cuomo, preface by Robert Coles, interviews reported by Victoria Kohn.
 Mary Ellen Mark: American Odyssey. New York: Aperture, 1999. . Edited by Melissa Harris, afterword by Mark and with a poem each by Maya Angelou and La Shawndrea. Accompanied an exhibition by Philadelphia Museum of Art. "A broad survey of photographs taken across the United States from 1963–1999."
 Mary Ellen Mark 55. Phaidon 55 series. London: Phaidon, 2001. . "A collection of both iconic and previously unpublished photographs."
 Mary Ellen Mark. Photo Poche series. Paris: Nathan, 2002. "Photographs taken between 1965 and 2001."
 Twins. New York: Aperture, 2003. .
 Exposure: Mary Ellen Mark: The Iconic Photographs. London: Phaidon, 2005. Hardback, 2005. . Paperback, 2006. . A retrospective. Introductions by Weston Naef and Mark, extensive captions by Mark.
 Undrabörn: Extraordinary Child. Reykjavík: National Museum of Iceland, 2007. . Foreword by Margaret Hallgrimsdottir, introduction by Mark, essay by Einar Falur Ingólfsson. Catalogue of an exhibition at the National Gallery of Photography, 8 September 2007 – 27 January 2008. Icelandic and English.
 Seen Behind the Scene. London: Phaidon, 2008. . Introduction by Mark, "A World Behind the Scene" and texts by Francis Ford Coppola, Helen Mirren, Alejandro González Iñárritu and others. Portraits made on film sets.
 Uno sguardo dietro le quinte. Quarant'anni di fotografie sui set cinematografici. Phaidon, 2009. .
 Prom. Los Angeles: J. Paul Getty Museum, 2012. . "Images of high school students at their proms, photographed by Mary Ellen Mark at thirteen schools across the United States. The book includes a DVD of the film, also titled Prom, by filmmaker Martin Bell"
 Man and Beast: Photographs from Mexico and India. Austin: University of Texas, 2014. . With transcript of an interview with Mark by Melissa Harris.
 Mary Ellen Mark on the Portrait and the Moment. The Photography Workshop Series. New York: Aperture, 2015. .
 Tiny: Streetwise Revisited. New York: Aperture, 2015. . With an afterword by Mark, a prologue by Isabel Allende and text by John Irving.
 The Book of Everything. Göttingen, Germany: Steidl, 2020. Edited by Martin Bell. .

Exhibitions 
 2003 – Twins, Marianne Boesky Gallery – New York, New York 
 2004 – Mary Ellen Mark: Twins and Falkland Road, Museum of Contemporary Photography – Chicago, Illinois 
 2005 – Falkland Road, Yancey Richardson – New York, New York 
 2008 – Mary Ellen Mark: The Prom Series, Johnson Museum of Art – Ithaca, New York 
 2009 – Seen Behind The Scene, Staley Wise Gallery – New York, New York 
 2012 – Prom: Photographs, Philadelphia Museum of Art – Philadelphia, Pennsylvania 
 2014 – Mary Ellen Mark: Man and Beast, The Wittliff Collections | Texas State University – San Macros, Texas 
 2016 – Attitude: Portraits by Mary Ellen Mark, 1964–2015, Howard Greenberg Gallery – New York, New York 
 2017 – Looking For Home: A Yearlong Focus, The Museum of Street Culture – Dallas, Texas 
 2021 – Mary Ellen Mark: Girlhood, National Museum of Women In The Arts – Washington, DC

Recognition and awards

Grants and fellowships
 1975: United States Information Agency grant to lecture and exhibit photographs in Yugoslavia
 1977: National Endowment for the Arts
 1977: New York State Council for the Arts grant
 1979–1980: National Endowment for the Arts
 1990: National Endowment for the Arts
 1994: John Simon Guggenheim Fellowship
 1997: Hasselblad Foundation Grant to continue work on American Odyssey

References

External links
 
 
 'Remembering the photographer who shot Seattle’s street youth' – 2012 interview in Dazed
 Scotsman newspaper interview, June 2005
 Audio interview, The Digital Journalist, March 1999
 Art HERStory: Mary Ellen Mark 

1940 births
2015 deaths
Deaths from myelodysplastic syndrome
American photojournalists
American portrait photographers
Photography in India
National Endowment for the Arts Fellows
People from Montgomery County, Pennsylvania
People from Cheltenham, Pennsylvania
Artists from Philadelphia
Magnum photographers
Deaths from cancer in New York (state)
Journalists from Pennsylvania
University of Pennsylvania School of Design alumni
Annenberg School for Communication at the University of Pennsylvania alumni
20th-century American women photographers
20th-century American photographers
21st-century American women
Women photojournalists
Fulbright alumni